Angoulême Cathedral is a Roman Catholic church in Angoulême, Charente, France. The cathedral is in the Romanesque architectural and sculptural tradition, and is the seat of the Bishop of Angoulême.

History
A first cathedral was built on the site of a primitive, pre-Christian sanctuary, in the 4th century. The edifice was destroyed when the town was taken by Clovis after the Battle of Vouillé (507). Another cathedral was consecrated in 560, but this was also set on fire, maybe by the Vikings/Normans some two centuries later.

A third cathedral was then constructed under bishop Grimoard, abbot of Saint-Pierre de Brantôme. The new church was consecrated in 1017. However, at the beginning of the 12th century the citizens started to consider it too small for to the wealth of the county. The designer was bishop Gerard II, one of the most important French figures of the time, who was a professor, Papal legate for four popes and also a notable artist. Works began about 1110 and finished in 1128.

The church's original appearance was modified in the following centuries. One of the bell towers, for example, was destroyed during the Wars of Religion of the 16th century. Further alterations were made during the restorations by Paul Abadie in 1866-1885, including the addition of the two towers with conical tops, but the façade remains mostly medieval.

Architecture and art

The façade is decorated by more than 70 sculptures, organized into two decorative themes, the Ascension and the Last Judgement, which are cleverly intermingled. Christ is portrayed within mandorlas, while two tall angels address the apostles to show them the celestial vision. All their faces, as well as those of the other faithful under the arches, look toward the Redeemer; vice versa, the damned, pushed back in the side arches and turned into Satan's victims, suffer their punishment.

Apart from these two main subjects, the sculptors portrayed scenes of everyday life, such as hunting, not avoiding to underline hardships and painstaking labour.

The interior of the nave is covered with three domes, a transept of great length with lofty towers over the north and south ends, and an apsidal choir with four chevet chapels. At the crossing with the transept, is a larger dome over pendentives, which has replaced the original one destroyed in the Protestant siege of 1568. Once lighted by two lantern towers, the transept has maintained only the northern one (Abadie also modified it, and moved the medieval sculptures to other locations), characterized by several orders of mullioned windows.

The semicircular choir is flanked by small apses and covered by a half dome.

See also
 History of medieval Arabic and Western European domes

External links

 
Page with photos and drawings
 Abadie, Paul, restorer, "Angoulême Cathedral, under Renovation." (undated albumen print from ca. 1865-ca. 1886), A. D. White Architectural Photographs Collection, Cornell University Rare and Manuscript Collections (15/5/3090.01431)
 High-resolution 360° Panoramas and Images of Angoulême Cathedral | Art Atlas

4th-century churches
Buildings and structures completed in 1128
12th-century Roman Catholic church buildings in France
Roman Catholic cathedrals in France
Romanesque architecture in France
Churches in Charente
Angoulême
Burial sites of the House of Valois-Angoulême